Troye Sivan Mellet (born 5 June 1995) is an Australian singer, actor and YouTuber. After gaining popularity as a singer on YouTube and in Australian talent competitions, Sivan signed with EMI Australia in 2013 and released his third extended play, TRXYE (2014), which peaked at number five on the US Billboard 200. Its lead single, "Happy Little Pill", reached number ten on Australian music charts. In 2015, he released his fourth extended play Wild followed by his debut studio album Blue Neighbourhood, whose lead single "Youth" became Sivan's first single to enter the top 40 of the Billboard Hot 100 chart, peaking at number 23. His second studio album Bloom (2018) reached number three in Australia, and number four on the Billboard 200 chart. Its lead single, "My My My!", became Sivan's second number-one single on the Billboard Dance Club Songs chart. In 2020, his EP In a Dream was released.

As an actor, Sivan portrayed the younger Wolverine in X-Men Origins: Wolverine (2009) and starred as the titular character in the Spud film trilogy. As a YouTube personality, Sivan used to upload video blogs regularly and, as of 2021, has over 7.3million subscribers and over 1.3billion total views. In 2014, Time named Sivan as one of the "25 Most Influential Teens of 2014". In 2017, he became the youngest recipient to receive a GLAAD Stephen F. Kolzak Award.

In 2018, he received a Golden Globe nomination for Best Original Song for "Revelation", from the film Boy Erased, in which he also had a supporting acting role. In 2022, he starred in the movie Three Months.

Early life 
Sivan was born in Johannesburg, South Africa, the son of Laurelle Mellet, a homemaker and former model, and Shaun Mellet, an entrepreneur and real estate agent. Sivan grew up in Perth, Western Australia, with his parents and three siblings. He was raised in an Orthodox Jewish family, though he does not consider himself to be religious—his father was born to a Jewish family of Lithuanian-Jewish descent and his mother converted to Judaism. Sivan attended Carmel School, a private Modern Orthodox school, until 2009, when he started distance education. His middle name turned surname Sivan is a Hebrew calendar month.

Career

Music 
Sivan's musical career started when he sang at the 2006, 2007 and 2008 Channel Seven Perth Telethon. His 2006 performance included a duet with Australian Idol winner Guy Sebastian. Sivan made it to the finals of StarSearch 2007. His debut EP Dare to Dream was released in June 2007. In February 2010, Sivan opened "We Are the World 25 for Haiti (YouTube Edition)", the collaborative music charity video produced by Lisa Lavie to help raise money for the victims of the 2010 Haiti earthquake.

On 5 June 2013, Sivan was signed to EMI Australia, a Universal Music Australia label, but kept it a secret until a year later. On 15 August 2014 he released a five-song EP entitled TRXYE, led by its first single "Happy Little Pill", which was released on 25 July 2014. TRXYE debuted at No. 1 on iTunes in over 55 countries. The EP debuted at No. 5 on the Billboard 200 the following week, scoring Sivan his first Top 10 album. "Happy Little Pill" peaked at number 10 on the ARIA Singles Chart and was certified gold by the Australian Recording Industry Association for shipments exceeding 35,000 copies. Sivan released his second major-label EP, Wild, on 4 September 2015. The EP was supported by a music video trilogy entitled Blue Neighbourhood, comprising the three songs "Wild", "Fools" and "Talk Me Down" and released from September 2015 to December 2015. Additionally, the EP served as an introduction to his debut studio album Blue Neighbourhood, which was released on 4 December 2015. The single "Youth" reached number 23 in the Billboard Hot 100. Sivan supported Blue Neighbourhood and Wild with his first tour, 2015's Troye Sivan Live. He further supported Blue Neighbourhood with 2016's Blue Neighbourhood Tour and Suburbia Tour. On 26 May 2017, Troye collaborated with Martin Garrix to produce the song "There for You".

On 10 January 2018, Sivan released the single "My My My!", along with an accompanying music video. He confirmed that his second album was inspired by his then-boyfriend, American model Jacob Bixenman. The song was described as a departure from his earlier work, with Pitchfork calling his vocals "assured" and NPR Music describing it as "an infectious celebration of sexual desire". NPR also noted the significance of the song and music video displaying confidence in Sivan's sexuality, writing "[i]t's not every day you see a young, skinny, queer kid get to be completely himself in a music video, and Sivan makes us want to dance along with him." Sivan's first live performance of the song was on 20 January as the musical guest on Saturday Night Live in an episode hosted by Jessica Chastain. Sivan later confirmed that his new album would feature a collaboration with long-time friend Ariana Grande, titled "Dance to This". On 16 March, his song "Strawberries & Cigarettes" from the Love, Simon soundtrack was released. It received a nomination for the 2018 Satellite Awards for Best Original Song. "Bloom" was released as the third single on 2 May 2018, following "The Good Side". That month, he announced that his second studio album is titled Bloom, while accompanying Taylor Swift as a guest performer at a concert in Pasadena, California, during her Reputation Stadium Tour. The album was released on 31 August 2018. The album's final pre-release track, "Animal", was launched on 9 August 2018.

That same year, Sivan received a Golden Globe nomination for Best Original Song for "Revelation", which he recorded and co-wrote for the film Boy Erased. He was also shortlisted for an Academy Award for the song. In October 2018, Sivan collaborated with British singer-songwriter Charli XCX on the single "1999"; the two also performed the single together live on The Tonight Show Starring Jimmy Fallon. A sequel collaboration, titled "2099", was debuted on 6 June 2019 at the two artists' LA Pride event "Go West Fest" and released as a promotional single from Charli XCX's album Charli on 10 September 2019. In January 2019, Sivan released the single "I'm So Tired..." with American singer-songwriter Lauv. 

On 1 April 2020, Sivan released "Take Yourself Home", his first single from his fifth EP In a Dream. Sivan worked with freelance artists in need of work during the COVID-19 pandemic to create the visual art for his single. The artists, who Sivan met on Instagram, also designed t-shirts for the single, and all net proceeds were donated to the WHO COVID-19 Solidarity Response Fund and Spotify's COVID-19 Music Relief Project. On 15 July, Sivan released the single "Easy" and announced the release of the concept EP In a Dream. The EP was released on 21 August 2020. In June 2021, he performed songs from the EP for Grubhub's virtual concert series Sound Bites. For every comment on the livestream, Grubhub donated $10 to support the NGLCC's efforts in assisting LGBT-owned restaurants during the COVID-19 pandemic. 

On 16 April 2021, his collaboration "You" with Regard and Tate McRae was released. The song topped the Hot Dance Electronic Songs Chart for eight weeks. On 27 August, Sivan announced his single "Angel Baby", which was released on 10 September. It reached the top 5 in several countries in Southeast Asia. 

On 2 February 2022, it was announced that Sivan had written two original songs for the upcoming film Three Months, which was scheduled for release on 23 February. On 18 February 2022, Sivan announced that in Three Months, he would portray Caleb, a 17-year-old infected with HIV following a one-night fling on the eve of his high school graduation. The film explores the ongoing stigma that HIV-positive persons experience.

Music videos 
Sivan's music videos frequently feature gay relationships between the characters. Blue Neighbourhoods trilogy followed the narrative of two gay teenagers in a secret relationship while "Youth" featured Sivan with another male love interest. His music video for "Heaven" features footage of historical LGBT movements and couples, as well as sensual shots with him and an anonymous man with the running taglines "Without losing a piece of me, how do I get to Heaven?" and "If I'm losing a piece of me, maybe I don't want Heaven". The singer says these portrayals are important to him, especially when he considers his younger life when he remembers "such vivid memories of the few times I saw any type of LGBTQ relationship on TV or in music videos".

On 16 July 2020, Sivan released a self-directed music video for his second song, "Easy", from his EP In a Dream. A remix of "Easy", featuring country singer-songwriter Kacey Musgraves and producer Mark Ronson, was released alongside a second music video in December 2020.

Acting 
In 2007, Sivan starred as Oliver Twist in a production of Oliver! at the Regal Theatre. In 2008, Sivan was cast in a Western Australian short film, Betrand the Terrible. In February 2008, Sivan was cast as young James Howlett in X-Men Origins: Wolverine. Sivan got the part after videos of his telethon performance were posted on YouTube, catching the attention of a Hollywood agent who contacted Sivan and asked him to send in an audition tape. Though Kodi Smit-McPhee was already cast for this role, he was unable to be a part of the film, due to his other film, The Road. In July 2009, he auditioned successfully for the lead role in Spud, a film adaptation of the 2005 novel by South African author John van de Ruit. Filming took place in South Africa from early March to mid-April 2010. The film was released in South Africa on 3 December 2010 and was later nominated for six SAFTAs, including a Best Lead Actor in a Feature Film nomination for Sivan.

Sivan appeared in the Western Australian season of Samuel Beckett's absurdist play Waiting for Godot which opened on 28 May 2010. Sivan shared the role of "Boy" with Craig Hyde-Smith, alternating nights. In June 2012, Sivan returned to South Africa to film Spud 2: The Madness Continues, which was released in South Africa on 21 June 2013. Sivan also starred in the third film in the series, Spud 3: Learning to Fly, released on 28 November 2014.

Sivan had a supporting role in the 2018 film Boy Erased. In 2022, he starred as Caleb in the feature film Three Months.

On 22 November 2021, Sivan was cast as a series regular in the upcoming HBO drama series The Idol.

Other ventures

YouTube 

In September 2012, Sivan began creating video blogs on the video sharing site YouTube, after having only sung on the site since 2007. At the time of posting his first vlog, Sivan had accumulated 27,000 subscribers in his five years since joining YouTube on 1 October 2007. A YouTube video Sivan made with fellow YouTuber Tyler Oakley, titled "The 'Boyfriend' Tag", earned them a Teen Choice Award in the "Choice Web Collaboration" category. As of June 2022, Sivan had over 7million subscribers and over 1billion total views across his YouTube videos.

Endorsements 
In 2018, Sivan was the face of Valentino's Spring/Summer 2018 collection. In 2019, he was an ambassador for MAC's Viva Glam campaign. He also appeared in Calvin Klein's #MyCalvins and #CK50 compaigns that year.  Since 2020, he has been a Cartier ambassador. In February 2021, Sivan's capsule t-shirt collection that he designed with Uniqlo was released. On 24 September 2021, he was featured as a model in the third volume of Rihanna's Savage X Fenty Show. In early 2022, he was involved in Beyoncé's Ivy Park's campaign for her capsule collection with Adidas. In June 2022, it was announced that he was an ambassador for YSL Beauty.

Artistry 
Sivan's favourite artists include Amy Winehouse, Taylor Swift and Lorde. MTV Artists cites Michael Jackson and Frank Ocean as additional influences. He told Wonderland magazine in 2018, "When I think about the songs that I grew up listening to that made me feel ... gay, it was mostly straight women: Cher, Madonna, Miley, Robyn, Lady Gaga. Those are my gay icons, which is a bit strange. I would have loved to have had more queer music growing up. That would have been nice." Sivan also cites Ariana Grande and Christina Aguilera as his inspirations, as his music video for "My My My!" was directly influenced by the one for "Dirrty" (2002).

Sivan's music has been described as "layered electropop with constant tinges of EDM". His baritone voice has received widespread praise, and his work has been compared to that of Lorde and Taylor Swift. In December 2020, Sivan was listed at number 34 in Rolling Stone Australias "50 Greatest Australian Artists of All Time" issue.

Personal life
Sivan came out publicly as gay via a YouTube video on 7 August 2013, three years after coming out to his family. He has a mild form of Marfan syndrome.

Filmography

Film

Television

Theatre

Discography 

 Blue Neighbourhood (2015)
 Bloom (2018)

Tours 
 Troye Sivan Live (2015)
 Blue Neighbourhood Tour (2016)
 Suburbia Tour (2016)
 The Bloom Tour (2018–2019)

Awards and nominations

References

External links 

 
 
 

 
1995 births
Living people
APRA Award winners
ARIA Award winners
Australian child singers
Australian gay musicians
Australian gay actors
Australian Jews
Australian male child actors
Australian people of Lithuanian-Jewish descent
Australian people of South African descent
Australian pop singers
Australian YouTubers
Dance-pop musicians
Former Orthodox Jews
Gay singers
Jewish Australian male actors
Jewish Australian musicians
Jewish singers
Gay Jews
Australian LGBT singers
LGBT YouTubers
Male actors from Perth, Western Australia
Male bloggers
Musicians from Perth, Western Australia
People with Marfan syndrome
South African emigrants to Australia
Synth-pop singers
Australian video bloggers
21st-century Australian male actors
21st-century Australian male singers
21st-century LGBT people